Chicobi Ecological Reserve is an ecological reserve of Quebec, Canada. It was established on May 11, 2002.

References

External links
 Official website from Government of Québec

Protected areas of Abitibi-Témiscamingue
Nature reserves in Quebec
Protected areas established in 2002
2002 establishments in Quebec